Shin Ae (Hangul: 신애, born March 13, 1982) is a South Korean actress and model.

Career
Although debuting as an actress on SBS drama series Medical Center in 2000, as well as being a model for major endorsement companies such as LG Cyon and Olay, Shin Ae mainly portrayed supporting characters on television, her biggest roles being in KBS's Summer Scent in 2003, and Empress Cheonchu in 2009.

Her popularity skyrocketed when she was cast in MBC's reality show We Got Married with Clazziquai member Alex. Although they departed in the 8th episode due to Alex's schedule conflicts, they returned in the 13th episode.

On October 2, 2008, Shinae's close friend Choi Jin-sil committed suicide, shocking the nation. Netizens assumed that the emotional impact would cause Shinae to leave the show. However, it was later revealed that they would leave the show anyway, for the reason of filming schedule conflicts for Shinae's drama Empress Cheonchu.

Alex and Shin Ae made their official exit from the show on November 16, 2008.

Personal life
On May 28, 2009, Shinae married Park Jae Gwan, a close family friend, at Sheraton Walker Hill Hotel in Seoul. After two years of marriage in August 2011 she announced she was pregnant with her first child with husband Park Jae Gwan.

Filmography

TV series
 Medical Center, SBS, 2000
 Four Sisters, MBC, 2001
 Summer Scent, KBS, 2003
 War of the Roses, MBC, 2004
 More Beautiful Than a Flower, KBS, 2004
 Empress Chun Chu, KBS, 2009

Films
 Season in the Sun, 2002
 The Silver Knife, 2003

Music videos
 글루미 선데이 (Gloomy Sunday), Chae Dong Ha, 2002
 외워 두세요 (Please Remember), Sung Shi Kyung, 2003
 난... (I...), Oak Joo Hyun, 2003
 한번만 (Just Once), 2NB, 2005

Variety shows
 X-Man, SBS, 2006
 We Got Married, MBC, 2008

References

External links
Hancinema profile
Cyworld

1982 births
Living people
People from Seoul
Konkuk University alumni
South Korean television actresses
South Korean film actresses